Mirella Arnhold (born 30 May 1983) is a Brazilian alpine skier. She competed at the 2002 Winter Olympics and the 2006 Winter Olympics.

References

External links

1983 births
Living people
Brazilian female alpine skiers
Olympic alpine skiers of Brazil
Alpine skiers at the 2002 Winter Olympics
Alpine skiers at the 2006 Winter Olympics
Sportspeople from São Paulo